Spurger Independent School District is a public school district based in the community of Spurger, Texas (USA). It contains an elementary school and a combined middle/high school. 

In 2009, the school district was rated "recognized" by the Texas Education Agency.

References

External links
Spurger ISD

School districts in Tyler County, Texas